The White Spider (German: Die weiße Spinne) is a 1927 German silent film directed by Carl Boese and starring Maria Paudler, Walter Rilla and John Loder.

The film's sets were designed by Uwe Jens Krafft.

Cast
Maria Paudler as Miß Brown  
Walter Rilla as Lord Barrymore  
John Loder as Lord Gray  
Nien Soen Ling as Diener bei Miß Brown  
Kurt Gerron 
Wolfgang Zilzer as Diener bei Lord Barrymore  
Iris Arlan
Uwe Jens Krafft as Der Polizeipräsident

References

External links

Films of the Weimar Republic
Films directed by Carl Boese
German silent feature films
German black-and-white films
Phoebus Film films